Melanoptilia chalcogastra is a moth of the family Pterophoridae. It is known from British Guyana and Costa Rica.

The wingspan is 12–13 mm. Adults are on wing in March and July.

External links

Platyptiliini
Moths described in 1921
Taxa named by Edward Meyrick
Moths of South America